Clorinda Málaga de Prado (July 3, 1905 – September 17, 1993) was the First Lady of Peru from 1958 to 1962, during her marriage to the President of Peru, Manuel Prado Ugarteche.

Early life 
Clorinda Mercedes Málaga Bravo was born in Lima, the daughter of Fermín Málaga Santolalla and Clorinda Bravo Bresani. Her father was a mining executive and state official. She was educated at the Colegio del Sagrado Corazón Sophianum in Lima, with further studies in England and France.

First Lady of Peru 
Málaga began a relationship with Manuel Prado Ugarteche in the 1930s. They married in 1958, after he arranged for Pope Pius XII to grant a controversial annulment for his first marriage of over forty years. She served as First Lady for four years, accompanying Prado on state visits abroad, including a 1960 visit to France, and 1961 visit to the White House during the presidency of John F. Kennedy. She was considered a stylish and photogenic companion to the president. When Prado's government was overthrown by a military coup, she went into exile with him in Paris.

Later years 
Málaga de Prado was widowed when her husband died in Paris in 1967. A barriada (squatter settlement) in Lima was named for her in the 1960s. She died in Lima in 1993, aged 88 years.

References 

1905 births
1993 deaths
First Ladies of Peru
People from Lima
Peruvian women